Bjarne Mädel (born 12 March 1968) is a German actor based in Berlin.

Biography
Born in Hamburg, Mädel graduated from the Burggymnasium in Friedberg in der Wetterau. He studied theater studies and literature at the University of Erlangen and attended the University of Redlands in California. Mädel completed a diploma course in acting at the Konrad Wolf Film University of Babelsberg in Potsdam between 1992 and 1996.

He worked at Rostock People's Theatre from 1996 to 1999 and at Deutsches Schauspielhaus in Hamburg from 2000 to 2005. He gained television exposure starting in 2004 with the series Stromberg.

In 2020, Mädel directed the NDR film Sörensen hat Angst and also took on the leading role as Chief Detective Sörensen.

Awards and recognition
For his role in the series Crime Scene Cleaner, he was awarded the Grimme Prize in 2012 and 2013.

Selected filmography

Film

Television

References

Literature

External links
 
 Bjarne Mädel at filmportal.de
 Bjarne Mädel at Schott + Kreutzer talent agency

1968 births
Living people
German male film actors
German male television actors
21st-century German male actors